Halkapınar is a town and district of Konya Province in the Central Anatolia region of Turkey. According to 2000 census, population of the district is 6,255 of which 2,021 live in the town of Halkapınar.

Notes

References

External links
 District governor's official website 
 District municipality's official website 

Populated places in Konya Province
Districts of Konya Province